Brazil competed at the 1972 Summer Olympics in Munich, West Germany. 81 competitors, 78 men and 3 women, took part in 44 events in 13 sports. Brazil obtained two bronze medals in 1972. Japanese Brazilian judoka Chiaki Ishii won Brazil's first Olympic medal in judo. Triple jumper Nelson Prudêncio won his second medal in men's triple jump

Medalists

Athletics

Men
Track & road events

Field events

Basketball

Preliminary round

Group A
The top two teams from each group advance to the semifinals, while the remaining teams compete for 5th through 16th places in separate brackets.

Classification brackets

Boxing

Men

Cycling

Two cyclists represented Brazil in 1972.

Road

Equestrian

Dressage

Show jumping

Football

First round

Group C

 

Team Roster
 Vitor
 Osmar
 Fred
 Terezo
 Falcão
 Celso
 Pedrinho
 Rubens Galaxe
 Washington
 Roberto Dinamite
 Dirceu
 Nielsen
 Abel Braga
 Wagner
 Bolívar
 Ângelo
 Pintinho
 Zé Carlos
 Manoel

Judo

Men

Rowing

Men

Sailing

Open

Shooting

Four male shooters represented Brazil in 1972.
Men

Swimming

Men

Women

Volleyball

Preliminary round

Pool B

|}

|}

5th–8th semifinals

|}

7th place match

|}
Team Roster
João Lens
Delano Couto 
Antônio Carlos Moreno 
Luiz Eymard Coelho 
José Marcelino 
Mário Marcos Procópio 
Bebeto de Freitas 
Russo Sevciuc
Décio Cattaruzzi 
Alexandre Abeid
Celso Alexandre Kalache 
Aderval Luis Arvani

Weightlifting

Men

References

External links
Official Olympic Reports
International Olympic Committee results database

Nations at the 1972 Summer Olympics
1972 Summer Olympics
Olympics